Louisiana Highway 18 (LA 18) is a state highway that serves Ascension, St. James, St. John the Baptist, St. Charles, and Jefferson Parishes. Called the Great River Road, it runs from west to east, parallel to the west bank of the Mississippi River, running from Donaldsonville to Gretna. In the more rural parts of LA 18's span, it is commonly referred to as River Road, but it becomes 4th Street once it enters Westwego.

Route description
LA 18 begins as an undivided, two lane road in downtown Donaldsonville as Bayou Road, which runs parallel to the Mississippi River. It intersects with the Sunshine Bridge (LA 70) east of Donaldsonville, the Veterans Memorial Bridge (LA 3213) in Wallace, and Interstate 310 near Luling as it continues downriver. At Bridge City, LA 18 leaves the river and briefly merges with U.S. Highway 90 northbound, then turns east along Seven Oaks Blvd. while U.S. 90 crosses the Mississippi River via the Huey P. Long Bridge. LA 18 meets and briefly cojoins the alternate river road, LA 541. When LA 18 enters Westwego, LA 18 becomes 4th Street but still continues parallel to the river. In Gretna, LA 18 turns south, away from the river: first onto Huey P. Long Avenue for one block, then east along 5th Street to Lafayette Street. LA 18 then goes south and ends at the intersection of Lafayette St. and the Westbank Expressway.

History
Between the junction with LA 52 in Luling and Huey P. Long Avenue in downtown Gretna, LA 18 is largely the original routing of U.S. Highway 90 (also LA 2 before the 1955 renumbering) and before that, the Old Spanish Trail highway.  (One notable exception is that LA 18 is routed along Louisiana Street rather than the parallel Sala Avenue through Westwego's historic district.)

Major intersections

Louisiana Highway 18 Spur

In Westwego, LA 18 turns from Louisiana Street onto 4th Street.

References

External links

La DOTD State, District, and Parish Maps
District 02
District 61
District 62
Ascension Parish
St. James Parish
St. John the Baptist Parish
St. Charles Parish
Jefferson Parish (North Section)

0018
Transportation in Ascension Parish, Louisiana
Transportation in St. James Parish, Louisiana
Transportation in St. John the Baptist Parish, Louisiana
Transportation in St. Charles Parish, Louisiana
Transportation in Jefferson Parish, Louisiana
018
U.S. Route 90
1955 establishments in Louisiana